Warmsworth railway station was a railway station to serve the village of Warmsworth, South Yorkshire, England and was on the Hull and Barnsley and Great Central Joint Railway. It was built ready for the opening of the line on 1 May 1916 with flanking platforms and facilities. However, although the line opened to goods traffic on that date, along with the other stations on the line it never opened for passengers.

The only passenger trains to operate over the line were enthusiasts' specials, the last of these being the "Doncaster Decoy" on 5 October 1968.

References

Great Central Vol.3 (Fay sets the pace 1900 - 1922) Ian Allan / Locomotive Pub. Co., 1965 
Railways of the South Yorkshire Coalfield from 1880, A.L.Barnett, RCTS 1984. 

Disused railway stations in Doncaster
Unbuilt railway stations in the United Kingdom